Jean Dupong (18 May 1922 – 6 December 2007) was a Luxembourgish politician.  A member of the Christian Social People's Party (CSV), Dupong held a number of positions in government and within the party.

Dupong was first elected to the Chamber of Deputies in the 1954 election.  He would be re-elected until his retirement from the Chamber in 1979.  During this time, he was a member of Pierre Werner's cabinet from 1967 to 1974, including as Minister for Justice from 1967 to 1969.  Dupong was also President of the CSV from 1965 to 1972.

Dupong was appointed to the Council of State in 1979, in which he sat until 1994.  He served as the Council's Vice-President (1988–91), before becoming President (1991–94): becoming the most prominent politician to hold the position since Léon Kauffman in 1952.

He was the son of former Prime Minister Pierre Dupong.

Footnotes

|-

|-

Ministers for Justice of Luxembourg
Presidents of the Council of State of Luxembourg
Members of the Council of State of Luxembourg
Christian Social People's Party politicians
20th-century Luxembourgian lawyers
1922 births
2007 deaths
People from Luxembourg City